The list of ship commissionings in 1902 includes a chronological list of all ships commissioned in 1902.


References

See also 

1902
 Ship commissionings